Pablo Grandjean, better known as Pol Granch (4 April 1998), is a Spanish-French singer-songwriter and actor.

Career 
In 2018, Granch won the third season of the talent contest Factor X España. During the contest, he competed in Laura Pausini's team performing songs including "El sitio de mi recreo" by Antonio Vega, "Pausa" by Izal, and "La quiero a morir" by Francis Cabrel.

In 2019, his first solo single, "Late", was released along with its music video. It was at this moment he began balancing his music career with songwriting and recording projects. His first EP, self-titled, was released on 26 April 2019.

On 29 May 2020, he released his debut studio album's lead single "Tengo que calmarme". The full album of the same name was released on 26 June 2020.

That same year, it was announced that he was jumping into acting, starring as Philippe, a French prince, in the fourth season of the Spanish Netflix series Élite. The season was released on 18 June 2021.

In 2021, Granch released the single "Tiroteo", featuring Marc Seguí, and a remix featuring Rauw Alejandro. He later released the singles "No pegamos" and "Lüky Charm".

In October 2022 he released his second studio album “Amor Escupido” preceded by the singles “De Colegio”, “No Te Bastó, Mi Corazón”, “solo x ti” and “Platicamos”.

Discography

Studio albums

EP

Singles

As lead artist

 As featured artist

Filmography

Awards and nominations

Results

Publications

References

External links 
 
 

1998 births
Living people
Spanish male singers
Spanish male television actors
21st-century Spanish male actors
Male actors from Madrid